This list is of Major Sites Protected for their Historical and Cultural Value at the National Level in the Province of Zhejiang, People's Republic of China.

  

|

 

 

  

  

  

 
 

 

 

|}

See also

 Principles for the Conservation of Heritage Sites in China

References

 
Zhejiang